Vasilica may refer to:
 Vasilica (holiday)

See also 
 Vasilitsa, mountain in Greece